Microelectronics International is a peer-reviewed scientific journal published quarterly by Emerald Group Publishing. The editor is John Atkinson. It covers research on miniaturized electronic devices, microcircuit engineering, semiconductor technology, and systems engineering. Publishing formats include original technical papers, research papers, case studies, reviews, and book reviews. The journal was established in 1982 as Hybrid Circuits.

Abstracting and indexing
This journal is abstracted and indexed in the following databases:

References

External links
 
 Hybrid Circuits.

Electronics journals
Semiconductor journals
Quarterly journals
English-language journals
Publications established in 1982
Emerald Group Publishing academic journals
Electrical and electronic engineering journals